A reverberation chamber or room is a room designed to create a diffuse or random incidence sound field (i.e. one with a uniform distribution of acoustic energy and random direction of sound incidence over a short time period).  Reverberation chambers tend to be large rooms (the resulting sound field becomes more diffused with increased path length) and have very hard exposed surfaces. The change of impedance (compared to the air) these surfaces present to incident sound is so large that virtually all of the acoustic energy that hits a surface is reflected back into the room. Arranging the room surfaces (including the ceiling) to be non-parallel helps inhibit the formation of standing waves - additional acoustic diffusers are often used to create more reflecting surfaces and further encourage even distribution of any particular sound field.

Reverberation chambers are used in acoustics as well as in electrodynamics, such as for measurement microphone calibration, measurement of the sound power of a source, and measurement of the absorption coefficient of a material. All these techniques assume the sound field in the chamber to be diffuse, and will normally use a broadband sound source (e.g. white noise or pink noise) so that the resulting sound field contains acoustic energy across the whole audible range.

See also
 Anechoic chamber, an acoustic test facility which minimizes reverberation
 Echo chamber, a reverberation room used for music recording
 Electromagnetic reverberation chamber, an electromagnetic environment mainly for electromagnetic compatibility testing

References
ISO Standard for Measurement of Acoustic Absorption in a Reverberation Room

External links
 360 video of a reverberation chamber
 Pictures and further description of a reverberation chamber

Acoustics